Harry Hawkins was an athlete and engineer.

Harry Hawkins may also refer to:

Harry Hawkins, character in Softly, Softly (TV series) and Softly, Softly: Taskforce
Harry Hawkins, character in Stranger in the House (1967 film)
Harry Hawkins (footballer, born 1915) (1915-1992), English footballer, in 1947–48 Rochdale A.F.C. season

See also
Harold Hawkins (disambiguation)
Henry Hawkins (disambiguation)